= Arete Project =

Educational institution in Alaska, U.S.

Coordinates: 58.4146°N 135.7737°W

The Arete Project was a tertiary educational institution in southeast Alaska. It charged no fees and was funded by donors.

It was called "a Deep Springs College for women" in The New Yorker.

It was one precursor to the Tidelines Institute.
